"Something That We Do" is a song recorded by American country music artist Clint Black and written by Black and Skip Ewing. It was released in August 1997 as the second single from Black's album Nothin' but the Taillights and peaked at number 2 on the U.S. Billboard Hot Country Singles & Tracks chart and number 4 on the Canadian RPM Country Tracks chart. It was voted song of the year by the Nashville Songwriters Association International.

Content
The song explores the complexities of romantic relationships and offers the simple truth that "Love isn't something that we're in/It's something that we do." It is sung in the key of G major and a slow tempo of 66 beats per minute. The guitar in the song is set to Open D tuning, with a capo on the fifth fret.

Critical reception
Deborah Evans Price, of Billboard magazine reviewed the song favorably, saying that the song "has a powerful and poignant poetic tone that illuminates more about the nature of love and relationships in a few minutes than several books on the subject ever could." She goes on to call the song a "sweet, moving ballad."

Music video
The music video was directed by Black with the help of Timothy White.

Charts
"Something That We Do" debuted at number 62 on the U.S. Billboard Hot Country Singles & Tracks for the week of August 30, 1997.

Year-end charts

References

1997 singles
1997 songs
Clint Black songs
Songs written by Skip Ewing
Songs written by Clint Black
Song recordings produced by Clint Black
Song recordings produced by James Stroud
RCA Records Nashville singles